The 1997–98 Michigan State Spartans men's basketball team represented Michigan State University in the 1997–98 NCAA Division I men's basketball season. The team played their home games at Breslin Center in East Lansing, Michigan as members of the Big Ten Conference. They were coached by third-year head coach, Tom Izzo. The Spartans finished the season 22–8, 13–3 in Big Ten play to win a share the regular season Big Ten regular season championship. As the No. 1 seed in the inaugural Big Ten tournament, they were upset by Minnesota in the quarterfinals. MSU received a bid to the NCAA tournament as the No. 4 seed in the East region, marking the school's first appearance in the Tournament since 1995 and first under Izzo. They defeated Eastern Michigan in the First Round which marked their first Tournament win since 1994. They then defeated Princeton to advance to the Sweet Sixteen for the first time since 1990. There they lost to No. 1-ranked North Carolina.

Previous season 
The Spartans finished the 1996–97 season 17–12, 9–9 in Big Ten play to finish in a three-way tie for sixth place. Michigan State received an invitation to the NIT and beat George Washington in the first round. In the second round, they lost to Florida State.

The Spartans lost Jon Garavaglia (10.4 points and 5.9 rebounds per game) and Ray Weathers (13.6 points per game) to graduation following the season.

Season summary 
The Spartans began the season looking for their first trip to the NCAA tournament since 1995. They were led by sophomore Mateen Cleaves (16.1 points and 7.2 assists per game) and junior Jason Klein (11.2 points per game). This season marked the first year for all four of MSU's "Flintstones", Cleaves (sophomore), Charlie Bell (freshman), Antonio Smith (junior), and Morris Peterson (sophomore), who would end their careers with a National Championship in 2000.

The Spartans played one ranked team in the non-conference season, No. 7 Temple, and lost 56–54. MSU also suffered surprising losses to UIC and Detroit in non-conference. MSU finished the non-conference season at 7–3.

The Spartans opened the Big Ten season with a win against No. 4 Purdue. Following a loss at No. 17 Michigan, the Spartans won their next eight conference games before losing at eventual Big Ten co-champion, Illinois. In January, MSU entered the AP and Coaches rankings for the first time since the end of the 1994–95 season. The Spartans finished in a tie for the conference championship, their first since 1990, with a record of 13–3 in conference play. The Spartans earned the No. 1 seed in the inaugural Big Ten tournament, but lost their first game in the quarterfinals to Minnesota.

The Spartans received an at-large bid to the NCAA tournament as a No. 4 seed in the East Region, their first trip to the Tournament since 1995. MSU advanced to their first Sweet Sixteen since 1990 by beating Eastern Michigan and No. 8 Princeton. The Spartans were eliminated from the tournament by No. 1 North Carolina in the Sweet Sixteen.

As of 2022, no MSU team has failed to make the NCAA tournament, a streak which began with the 1997–98 team.

Roster and statistics 

Source

Schedule and results

|-
!colspan=9 style=""| Exhibition

|-
!colspan=9 style=| Non-conference regular season

|-
!colspan=9 style=""|Big Ten regular season

|-
!colspan=9 style=|Big Ten tournament

|-
!colspan=9 style="|NCAA tournament

Rankings

Source.

Awards and honors

Mateen Cleaves
 Big Ten Player of the Year 
 All-American Second Team
 All-Big Ten First Team

Tom Izzo
 AP Basketball Coach of the Year
 Henry Iba National Coach of the Year
 Basketball News' National Coach of the Year
 Big Ten Coach of the Year (Media and Coaches)

Antonio Smith
All-Big Ten Third Team

Jason Klein
 All-Big Ten Honorable Mention

References

Michigan State Spartans men's basketball seasons
Michigan State Spartans
Michigan State Spartans men's b
Michigan State Spartans men's b
Michigan State